Melipotis evelina is a species of moth in the family Erebidae. It is found in Mexico (Yucatán, Mérida) and Jamaica.

References

Moths described in 1878
Melipotis